Alor Regency is a regency (kabupaten) in East Nusa Tenggara (NTT) province of Indonesia. Established in 1958, Alor Regency administers the Alor Archipelago with its seat (capital) in Kalabahi on Alor Island.

Alor Regency occupies 2,928.88 km2 land area and 10,973.62 km2 water area. There are seventeen islands in the archipelago, of which the largest by far are Alor itself and Pantar; there are another six inhabited islands (including Pura, Treweng, Kepa, Buaya, Kangge and Kura); the remaining nine islands (Sika, Nub, Kapas, Batang, Lapang, Ternate, Rusa, Tikus and Kambing) are uninhabited. To the east lies the island of (Atauro), part of the Republic of East Timor. Pantar and Alor Islands are separated by a wide strait with Pulau Buaya and Pulau Kambing at its northern point, Pulau Pura in the middle, and Pulau Treweng at its southern point. The regency had 190,026 inhabitants at the 2010 decennial census; at the 2030 census this had risen to 211,872; the official estimate as at mid 2021 was 213,994.

The main transportation access in the regency is by means of sea. The state-owned PELNI sea liners operate in the archipelago for major transport to the main port hub in Kalabahi beside small boats operating between small islands. A small Perintis Mali airstrip (18 km east of Kalabahi) can only be used by small CASA airplanes, operated by Merpati Nusantara Airlines.

As is the case in other parts of NTT province, the provision of education is often a major problem, especially in remote areas. In recent years, the district (regency) government has been trying to make it easier for children to attend school by, amongst other things, increasing the number of one-roof junior high schools. The standard of teaching is often also a major problem because many teachers lack proper qualifications.

Administration 
At the 2010 Census the regency was divided into seventeen districts (kecamatan), but an eighteenth distric was created in 2020 from the division of the Alor Barat Daya District. All eighteen districts are tabulated below with their areas and their populations at the 2010 census and the 2020 census, together with the official estimates as at mid 2021. The table also includes the locations of the district administrative centres, the number of villages (rural desa and urban kelurahan) in each district, and its post code.

Notes: (a) includes just the northern part of Pantar Island. (b) includes offshore islands of Pulau Kura and uninhabited Batang and Lapang. (c) includes offshore Pulau Treweng. (d) includes offshore islands of Pulau Kangge and uninhabited Kambing, Rusa and Tikus. (e) the 2010 population of the new Abad Selatan District is included with the figure for Alor Barat Daya District, from which it was subsequently split off in 2020. (f) containing the town of Kalabahi, plus uninhabited Pulau Kapas. (g) includes the uninhabited offshore islands of Sika and Nub. (h) apart from villages of Alila Timur and Lawahing (which have a postcode of 85851}. (i) includes the offshore islands of Pulau Kepa, Pulau Buaya and uninhabited Pulau Ternate. (j) Pura island lies in the middle of the strait which separates Pantar and Alor Islands.

References

External links 
 
 Van Galen's memorandum on the Alor Islands 

East Nusa Tenggara
Regencies of East Nusa Tenggara